The Knight keyboard, designed by Tom Knight, was used with the MIT-AI lab's bitmapped display system. It was a precursor to the space-cadet keyboard and the later Symbolics keyboard.

Influence
The Knight keyboard is notable for its influence on Emacs keybindings, particularly for helping popularize the meta key, which originated with the Stanford keyboard. The layout is also noteworthy: the meta key was outside the control key, which is opposite from the layout used on most modern keyboards, dating to the Model M IBM PC keyboard, which uses the Alt key instead, and places it inward to the control key.

References

External links 
 

Computer keyboard types